Myennis is a genus of picture-winged flies in the family Ulidiidae.

Species
Myennis mandschurica Hering, 1956
Myennis monticola Stackelberg, 1945
Myennis nebulosa Krivosheina & Krivosheina, 1997
Myennis octopunctata (Coquebert, 1798)
Myennis sibirica Portschinsky, 1891
Myennis tricolor Hendel, 1909

References

Ulidiidae
Brachycera genera
Taxa named by Jean-Baptiste Robineau-Desvoidy
Diptera of Asia
Diptera of Europe
Diptera of North America
Myennis